Jebsen Group is a marketing, investment, and distribution organisation founded in 1895. It is headquartered in Hong Kong with offices in Mainland China and Macau. It consists of six business lines: Beverage, Consumer, Industrial, Motors, Logistics, and Jebsen Capital. It offers market access for over 200 leading companies to build their brands and market share in Greater China.

Hans Michael Jebsen is the chairman of the group, with Alfons Mensdorff-Pouilly serving as the CEO.

History 
Jebsen & Co. was established in Hong Kong in March 1895 by second grade cousins Jacob Jebsen and Heinrich Jessen from Aabenraa. The company started as a shipping agency owned by Jebsen's father who had a fleet of fourteen coastal steamers at the Chinese coasts. With expanding business range, in January 1909 Jebsen & Jessen Hamburg was founded to coordinate the European business. In December 1963, Jebsen & Jessen Group was founded by Arwed Peter Jessen to concentrate on business in South East Asia.

Milestones
 1896: Jebsen becomes a member of the Hong Kong General Chamber of Commerce
 1897: Initial venture into the industrial sector, acquiring BASF agency to import indigo dyes to China
 1898: Establishment of Diederichsen, Jebsen & Co., Jebsen's first joint venture in China; its businesses include a Qingdao brick factory
 1906: Acquisition of Blue Girl Beer
 1941: Co-founder Jacob Jebsen died in Aabenraa at the age of 71. His eldest son took over the reins and Heinz Jessen and Michael Jebsen signed a new partnership agreement in Shanghai in January 1944.
 1953: The import of Hong Kong's first Volkswagen Beetle
 1955: The import of the territory's first Porsche, covering sole Porsche Car distribution in Hong Kong and Macao with additional seven dealerships in Mainland China.
 1957: Attending the inaugural Canton Fair
 1970: Collaboration with Siemens on a 10,000-line, computer-controlled public telephone system at Lai Chi Kok's Telephone Exchange
 1973: Modern Terminals Limited officially opens Hong Kong's first container terminal in Kwai Chung
 1978–1979: The first Liaison Office opens in Beijing
 1991: Jebsen Fine Wines is established in Hong Kong
 2001: The import of Mainland China's first Porsche
 2013: Multi-brand lifestyle retailer J SELECT launches
 2017: New business line Jebsen Capital launches
 2018: Opens New Plant in Dalian, together with Austrian partner TCG Unitech

Corporate structure

Jebsen Motors 

Jebsen Motors has represented Porsche in Hong Kong since 1955 and in the Chinese mainland since 2001. Globally, it is one of the longest-serving and largest Porsche dealer groups.

As Porsche China's Dealer of the Year for the seventh consecutive year in 2021, Jebsen Motors delivered more than 11,000 cars to the Chinese mainland, Macau and Hong Kong in 2021–representing approximately 12 percent of Porsche's total regional sales during this period.

Jebsen Beverage 
As the largest beer company in Hong Kong, Jebsen Beverage has been selling Blue Girl Beer since 1906, making it one of the most historic imports in the market. In 2019, Jebsen Beverage formed a joint venture in the Chinese mainland with the world's largest beer brewer AB InBev to accelerate Blue Girl Beer's growth in the Mainland market.

Jebsen Consumer 
Jebsen's focus in the consumer business has been on small domestic electrical appliances for over 40 years. Jebsen Consumer represents many brands including Bang & Olufsen and Casio.

Jebsen Capital 
Founded in 2017 as the investment division of Jebsen Group, Jebsen Capital is one of the early investors in the German COVID-19 vaccine manufacturer BioNTech and has led the Series C extension for the Berlin-based healthtech company PlusDental.

Group logo
The Jebsen Group's logo, established in the founding year of 1895, shows, surrounded by a laurel wreath, three mackerels on top of each other, with the top and bottom ones directing to the left side and the middle one to the right. The logo is related to the heraldic shield of the founders’ hometown in Aabenraa, which belonged to Germany in 1895, but was handed over to Denmark in 1920.

References

Trading companies of Hong Kong
Business services companies established in 1895
Privately held companies of China
1895 establishments in Hong Kong